Enrique Herrera (July 4, 1904 – December 28, 1991) was a Cuban film actor who settled in Mexico. He played the role of Emperor Maximilian in the 1934 Mexican historical film Juarez and Maximillian. He wrote, produced and directed the 1940 comedy film Narciso's Hard Luck, his only non-acting credits.

Selected filmography
 Juárez y Maximiliano (1934)
 La paloma (1937)
 Huapango (1938)
 Cada loco con su tema (1938)
 La tía de las muchachas (1938)
 Caballo a caballo (1939)
 Los apuros de Narciso (1940)
 Mil estudiantes y una muchacha (1941)
 Hotel de verano (1944)
 Una mujer que no miente (1944)
 Yo soy usted (1944)
 Cuando quiere un mexicano (1944)
 Me he de comer esa tuna (1945)
 Lo que va de ayer a hoy (1945)
 El superhombre (1946)
 El conquistador (1947)
 Canasta uruguaya (1951)
 Los dos rivales (1966)

References

Bibliography
 Herzberg, Bob. Revolutionary Mexico on Film: A Critical History, 1914-2014. McFarland, 2014.

External links

1904 births
1991 deaths
Cuban male film actors
Mexican male film actors
People from Havana
Cuban emigrants to Mexico
20th-century Cuban male actors